The Mexican tetra (Astyanax mexicanus), also known as the blind cave fish, blind cave characin, and blind cave tetra, is a freshwater fish of the family Characidae of the order Characiformes. The type species of its genus, it is native to the Nearctic realm, originating in the lower Rio Grande and the Neueces and Pecos Rivers in Texas, as well as the central and eastern parts of Mexico.

Its blind cave form, however, is notable for having no eyes or pigment; it has a pinkish-white color to its body (resembling an albino).

This fish, especially the blind variant, is reasonably popular among aquarists.

A. mexicanus is a peaceful species that spends most of its time in midlevel water above the rocky and sandy bottoms of pools and backwaters of creeks and rivers of its native environment. In the winter, some populations migrate to warmer waters. Its natural diet consists of crustaceans, insects, and annelids, although in captivity it is omnivorous.

The Mexican tetra has been treated as a subspecies of A. fasciatus, but this is not widely accepted. Additionally, the hypogean blind cave form is sometimes recognized as a separate species, A. jordani, but this directly contradicts phylogenetic evidence.

Blind cave form

A. mexicanus is famous for its blind cave form, which is known by such names as blind cave tetra, blind tetra (leading to easy confusion with the Brazilian Stygichthys typhlops), blind cave characin and blind cavefish. Depending on the exact population, cave forms can have degenerated sight or have total loss of sight and even their eyes, due to down-regulation of the protein αA-crystallin and consequent lens cell death. The fish in the Pachón caves have lost their eyes completely whilst the fish from the Micos cave only have limited sight. 
Cave fish and surface fish are able to produce fertile offspring.

These fish can still, however, find their way around by means of their lateral lines, which are highly sensitive to fluctuating water pressure. Blindness in A. mexicanus induces a disruption of early neuromast patterning, which further causes asymmetries in cranial bone structure. One such asymmetry is a bend in the dorsal region of their skull, which is propounded to increase water flow to the opposite side of the face, functionally enhancing sensory input and spatial mapping in the dark waters of caves. Scientists suggest that gene cystathionine beta synthase-a mutation restricts blood flow to cavefish eyes during a critical stage of growth so the eyes are covered by skin.

Currently, about 30 cave populations are known, dispersed over three geographically distinct areas in a karst region of San Luis Potosí and far southern Tamaulipas, northeastern Mexico. Among the various cave population are at least three with only full cave forms (blind and without pigment),  at least eleven with cave, "normal" and intermediate forms, and at least one with both cave and "normal" forms but no intermediates. Studies suggest at least two distinct genetic lineages occur among the blind populations, and the current distribution of populations arose by at least five independent invasions. Furthermore, cave populations have a very recent origin (< 20,000 years) in which blindness or reduced vision evolved convergently after surface ancestors populated several caves independently and at different times. This recent origin suggests that the phenotypic changes in cavefish populations, namely eye degeneration, arose as a result of the high fixation of genetic variants present in surface fish populations in a short period of time.

The eyed and eyeless forms of A. mexicanus, being members of the same species, are closely related and can interbreed making this species an excellent model organism for examining convergent and parallel evolution, regressive evolution in cave animals, and the genetic basis of regressive traits. This, combined with the ease of maintaining the species in captivity, has made it the most studied cavefish and likely also the most studied cave organism overall.

The blind and colorless cave form of A. mexicanus is sometimes recognized as a separate species, A. jordani, but this leaves the remaining A. mexicanus as a paraphyletic species and A. jordani as polyphyletic. The Cueva Chica Cave in the southern part of the Sierra del Abra system is the type locality for A. jordani. Other blind populations were initially also recognized as separate species, including antrobius described in 1946 from the Pachón Cave and hubbsi described in 1947 from the Los Sabinos Cave (both subsequently merged into jordani/mexicanus). The most divergent cave population is the one in Los Sabinos.

Another cave-adapted population of Astyanax, varying from blind and depigmented to individuals showing intermediate features, is known from the Granadas Cave, part of the Balsas River drainage in Guerrero, southern Mexico, but it is a part of A. aeneus (itself sometimes included in A. mexicanus).

Evolution research
The surface and cave forms of the Mexican tetra have proven powerful subjects for scientists studying evolution. When the surface-dwelling ancestors of current cave populations entered the subterranean environment, the change in ecological conditions rendered their phenotype—which included many biological functions dependent on the presence of light—subject to natural selection and genetic drift. One of the most striking changes to evolve was the loss of eyes. This is referred to as a "regressive trait" because the surface fish that originally colonized caves possessed eyes. In addition to regressive traits, cave forms evolved "constructive traits". In contrast to regressive traits, the purpose or benefit of constructive traits is generally accepted. Active research focuses on the mechanisms driving the evolution of regressive traits, such as the loss of eyes, in A. mexicanus. Recent studies have produced evidence that the mechanism may be direct selection, or indirect selection through antagonistic pleiotropy, rather than genetic drift and neutral mutation, the traditionally favored hypothesis for regressive evolution.

The blind form of the Mexican tetra is different from the surface-dwelling form in a number of ways, including having unpigmented skin, having a better olfactory sense by having taste buds all over its head, and by being able to store four times more energy as fat, allowing it to deal with irregular food supplies more effectively.

Darwin said of sightless fish:

Modern genetics has made clear that the lack of use does not, in itself, necessitate a feature's disappearance. In this context, the positive genetic benefits have to be considered, i.e., what advantages are obtained by cave-dwelling tetras by losing their eyes? Possible explanations include:
Not developing eyes allows the individual more energy for growth but not egg production. However the species does use other methods to locate food and detect danger, which also consume energy that would be conserved if it had eyes or transparent eyelids.
There remains less chance of accidental damage and infection, since the previously useless and exposed organ is sealed with a flap of protective skin. It is unknown why this species did not develop transparent skin or eyelids instead, as some species of reptiles did.
The lack of eyes disables the "body clock", which is controlled by periods of light and dark, conserving energy. However sunlight does have minimal impact on the "body clock" in caves.

Another likely explanation for the loss of its eyes is that of selective neutrality and genetic drift; in the dark environment of the cave, the eyes are neither advantageous nor disadvantageous and thus any genetic factors that might impair the eyes (or their development) can take hold with no consequence on the individual or species. Because there is no selection pressure for sight in this environment, any number of genetic abnormalities that give rise to the damage or loss of eyes could proliferate among the population with no effect on the fitness of the population.

Among some creationists, the cave tetra is seen as evidence 'against' evolution. One argument claims this is an instance of "devolution"—showing an evolutionary trend of decreasing complexity. But evolution is a non-directional process, and while increased complexity is a common effect, there is no reason why evolution cannot tend towards simplicity if that makes an organism better suited to its environment.

Inhibition of the HSP90 protein has a dramatic effect in the development of the blind tetra.

In the aquarium
The blind cave tetras seen in the aquarium trade are all based on stock collected in the Cueva Chica Cave in the southern part of the Sierra del Abra system in 1936. These were sent to an aquarium company in Texas, who soon started to distribute them to aquarists. Since then, these have been selectively bred for their troglomorphic traits. Today large numbers are bred at commercial facilities, especially in Asia.

The blind cave tetra is a hardy species. Their lack of sight does not hinder their ability to get food. They prefer subdued lighting with a rocky substrate, like gravel, mimicking their natural environment. They become semi-aggressive as they age, and are by nature schooling fish. Experiments have shown that keeping these fish in bright aquarium set-ups has no effect on the development of the skin flap that forms over their eyes as they grow.

See also
List of freshwater aquarium fish species

References

Tetras
Astyanax (fish)
Freshwater fish of Mexico
Freshwater fish of the United States
Cave fish
Blind animals
Least concern biota of the United States
Fish described in 1853
Taxa named by Filippo De Filippi